Manheim, Inc. is an automobile auction company and the world's largest wholesale auto auction, based on trade volume with 145 auctions located in North America, Europe, Asia and Australia. As a subsidiary of Cox Automotive, a subsidiary of privately owned Cox Enterprises, Inc. based in Atlanta, Georgia, Manheim's primary business is wholesaling vehicles via a bidding process using traditional and online formats. Manheim also provides other vital dealership and wholesale services, such as financing, title work, transportation (auto hauling), recovery, auto body repair, dealership management systems, dent repair and automotive reconditioning, and automotive re-marketing at each location.

History

Early history

In 1945, Benjamin Z. Mellinger, a Ford dealer in New Holland, Pennsylvania, and Arthur F. Walters, a Firestone tire dealer in Manheim, met to discuss the idea of auctioning cars after watching a farm equipment auction. They with Jacob "Jake" H. Ruhl, Paul H. Stern, and Robert Schreiber formed a partnership, each contributing $5000, and then, purchased a decrepit building along with its seven acres just south of Manheim to form the Manheim Auto Auction, Inc.. Their first sale ran three cars and sold just one to the general public. By 1947, the new building with four lanes to auction vehicles opened and soon the partners realized the general public was purchasing their vehicles at the auction instead of their dealership franchises. This action prompted the partners to make Manheim Auto Auction a dealer-only enterprise, making Manheim the largest auto exchange in 1959.

By 1966, Manheim Auto Auction established itself as the world's volume leader, selling off 45 vehicles per hour or 700 cars/trucks on a given Friday night at the 16-laned auction. Adding closed-circuit television, the dealers and wholesalers watched the auction from the new cafeteria in its expanded building. In 1965, Manheim Auto Auction purchased the National Auto Dealers Exchange in Bordentown, New Jersey, and then in 1967, it purchased the Fredericksburg Auto Exchange in Fredericksburg, Virginia. Thus, the partners made Manheim attractive for a potential buyer.

Manheim joins Cox Enterprises

Cox Enterprises entered the auto auction business in 1968, when it purchased Manheim Auto Auction in Manheim, Pennsylvania. Under Cox, Manheim continued to expand by providing vital services, such as reconditioning, recovery, and auto hauling, to both dealership and wholesalers. By the end of the 20th century, the Manheim Auto Auctions had advanced its sales by adding information technology (online sales). Today, Cox Enterprises owns 98% of Auto Trader, one of the world’s leading providers of online and print automotive consumer information.

Notable acquisitions

Manheim acquired Dent Wizard, the paintless dent removal company (also known as "PDR") in 1998. After turning it into the largest PDR company in the world, Manheim sold Dent Wizard's the United States and Canada markets to H.I.G. Capital, a leading global private equity firm, in November 2010.

In 2006, Manheim became interested in Akinvest Inc. This Canadian company started off as a business that speculated on world automobile values in 1991. The owner, Andrei Kouznetsov, developed a new concept that allowed a foreign dealer to have Akinvest perform all of the necessary procedures to have vehicles delivered to the port nearest to that buyer. By 2005 Akinvest, doing business as Exporttrader was completely developed the service aspects of the business that assisted non-North American dealers. The organization became known as the leader in the export of used cars field from North America. All of the major remarketing companies such as Copart, IAA, ADESA, Carfax and Manheim had foreign transactions that were completed by Akinvest/Exporttrader. 

The strength of the procedures used was enhanced by superior programming and automated Web Sites, retaining enormous banks of data. Export Trader/Akinvest negotiated for new export programs and procedures with the governments of Canada and United States and was consulted numerous times by International law enforcement on global irregularities. Exporttrader was consulted by marketing firms and journals like the Wall Street Journal. to give opinions on global automotive trade and were asked to speak at international conferences. In 2008 Akinvest/Export Trader had 70 employees with offices in Toronto, Moscow and Finland. "Akinvest is the parent company of two of the leading players in the export business: Freightmar International and ExportTrader.com.

The agreement was signed in January 2009 for a staged buyout of Akinvest/ Export Trader transforming the entire organization under the name WES Exporttrader.  The final stage of the transfer to Manheim occurred in late 2014. Subsequently, in April 2015, Manheim has closed the Canadian offices of WES Exporttrader and moved the operation to Atlanta. They now run "all new "Global Trader" out of Atlanta. Near the end of March 2016, Manheim Global Export was sold, but it had too many debts and eventually declared bankruptcy.

References

External links

Auto Mechanic Jobs with Manheim
 Manheim in export venture by Autonews
Manheim enters joint venture with Leading vehicle exporter akinvest
 Earnhardt Auto Centers

Cox Enterprises
American auction houses
American companies established in 1945
Retail companies established in 1945
Companies based in Lancaster County, Pennsylvania
Companies based in Atlanta
1945 establishments in Pennsylvania